Satish C. Sharma (11 October 1947 – 17 February 2021) was an Indian politician. He represented the Indian National Congress party, and was a former member of the Union Cabinet in the Government of India. Sharma's political career was boosted by his closeness to both Rajiv Gandhi, and after his assassination, his wife and the de facto political power center of the Congress party, Sonia Gandhi. He held seats in the Lok Sabha at the behest of both the Nehru-Gandhi family and the electorate.

Personal life

Satish Sharma was born on 11 October 1947 in Secunderabad, a city in the Indian state Telangana. He was educated in Col. Brown Cambridge School in Dehra Dun and was later trained as a pilot in Kansas City, Missouri. He was married to Sterre Sharma who founded and runs the Tribal jewellery museum at Mangar Bani on the Delhi-Haryana which is a sacred grove in Faridabad district. He died on 17 February 2021 in Goa.

Political career
In 1991 he was elected to the Lok Sabha in a by-poll from Rajiv Gandhi's constituency of Amethi following the latter's assassination. From January 1993 until December 1996 he was Minister of Petroleum and Natural Gas. He was elected to Lok Sabha from Amethi again in 1996, and after losing in Amethi in 1998, he was elected again to Lok Sabha from Raebareli in 1999.

In October 2021, Sharma was named in the Pandora Papers. These documents showed that Sharma owned property and had control of multiple international trusts, starting in 1995, which were not declared to the Election Commission. According to Sharma's wife Sterre Sharma, her husband had no offshore accounts, and the property was liquidated to pay taxes.

Parliamentary Committees 
 Member, Committee on Transport and Tourism (1999 – 2000)
 Member, Consultative Committee for the Ministry of Civil Aviation (October 2004 – May 2009 and August 2009 – July 2010)
 Member, Committee on Transport, Tourism and Culture (August 2009 – May 2014)
 Member, Committee on Urban Development (September 2014 – 2021)

References

External links
 Indian-express.com
 Business-standard.com
 Commoncauseindia.org
 Timesofindia.indiatimes.com
 Rediff.com
 Rediff.com

Indian National Congress politicians
Politicians from Hyderabad, India
India MPs 1991–1996
India MPs 1996–1997
India MPs 1999–2004
Lok Sabha members from Uttar Pradesh
Sharma Satish
Sharma Satish
1947 births
2021 deaths
Rajya Sabha members from Madhya Pradesh
People from Amethi district
Petroleum and Natural Gas Ministers of India
Politicians from Secunderabad
People named in the Pandora Papers